Frank Glazier (born January 4, 1934) is a former American football coach.  He served as the head football coach at William Paterson University team in Wayne Township, New Jersey for four years, from 1978 to 1981, compiled a record of 17–22–1.

Head coaching record

References

1934 births
Living people
William Paterson Pioneers football coaches